The Professional Hockey Writers Association (PHWA) is a North American professional association for ice hockey journalists writing for newspapers, magazines and websites. The PHWA was founded in 1967 and has approximately 180 voting members. The association was founded as the National Hockey League Writers' Association, then renamed itself to the Professional Hockey Writers' Association in 1971, to distinguish itself from National Hockey League (NHL) teams.

Functions
PHWA members vote for the following seven NHL individual awards: Hart Memorial Trophy, Lady Byng Memorial Trophy, Calder Memorial Trophy, James Norris Memorial Trophy, Conn Smythe Trophy, Bill Masterton Memorial Trophy, and Frank J. Selke Trophy. Members of the National Hockey League Broadcasters' Association vote for the Jack Adams Award (coaching), while the NHL general managers vote for the Vezina Trophy (top goalie). Members of the National Hockey League Players' Association vote for the Ted Lindsay Award. There are several other NHL awards, including the Mark Messier NHL Leadership Award and the Jim Gregory General Manager of the Year Award.

The members of the PHWA also vote for the Elmer Ferguson Memorial Award, presented by the Hockey Hall of Fame to professional hockey writers.

The association is dedicated to "preserving the rights and improving the access for members of the North American–based media who cover the sport of hockey all over the world".

Presidents
List of presidents of the National Hockey League Writers' Association (1966–1971), and the Professional Hockey Writers' Association since 1971:

See also
List of National Hockey League awards
National Sports Media Association

References

External links
Professional Hockey Writers Association official website

National Hockey League mass media
Ice hockey organizations
American sports journalism organizations
H
Canadian journalism organizations
Journalism-related professional associations
Organizations established in 1967